The Mount Beacon Incline Railway was a narrow gauge incline railway up Beacon Mountain near Beacon, New York.  A popular local tourist attraction, it operated for much of the 20th century, providing sweeping views of the Hudson River Valley.  Efforts to restore it continue today.

The Otis Elevator Company and Mohawk Construction opened the 2,200'  gauge railway on Memorial Day, 1902. Sixty thousand fares were sold in its first year; two decades later that had almost doubled. Riders were often day visitors from New York City who came up the Hudson River by steamboat to Newburgh and then took the Newburgh-Beacon Ferry across the river. After a trolley trip to the base station on Wolcott Avenue (today NY 9D), the railway would take them up to the  northern summit via an average gradient of 65% (33°) and a maximum gradient of 74% (36.5°), the steepest in existence while the railroad operated.

As was the case of so many other period incline railways, the Beacon funicular was in reality a means to a larger end.  The  panoramic views from the summit of Beacon Mountain and natural setting would be the lures to get tourists to the doorstep of several profitable attractions the railway's backers built atop the mountain, including the Beaconcrest Hotel, a Casino, and a private cottage community following land sales.  The hotel and casino were in place by 1926, which proved a banner year, with 110,000 passengers riding to the top.  Tragedy struck the next year, with fire consuming both the hotel and casino.  Though they were rebuilt within a year, this proved the turning point in the rail's history, with the tourism-dampening Great Depression and World War II to follow.

Thanks to the automobile replacing historic mass transit to the area - which had brought passengers en masse up the river in excursion boats, via the railroad, and thence trolley right to the base of the lift - recreational patterns changed and the Beacon attraction never regained its popularity.  Financial problems and more fires plagued the concern, which was unable to maintain necessary maintenance on either the railway or the summit attractions.

In 1978 the railway ceased operations. In 1982 it was added to the National Register of Historic Places. A fire attributed to vandalism the next year completely destroyed the trackway and consumed the lower station, following which the only remaining structure at the top, the powerhouse, was raised. The route still remains and is visible from much of the city. The Mount Beacon Incline Railway Restoration Society is working to rebuild the railroad and restore service.

See also 
 List of funicular railways

References

External links

Mount Beacon Incline Railway Restoration Society

Defunct funicular railways in the United States
Transport infrastructure completed in 1902
Hudson River
Beacon, New York
National Register of Historic Places in Dutchess County, New York
3 ft gauge railways in the United States
Railway inclines in the United States
Cableways on the National Register of Historic Places
Rail infrastructure on the National Register of Historic Places in New York (state)